Peter Daut (born September 18, 1983) is an American journalist who has been an anchor and investigative reporter at KESQ-TV in Palm Springs, California, since February 2020.

He was born in Torrance, California, grew up in Placentia and graduated from El Dorado High School. Daut then attended the University of Southern California, and graduated cum laude with double degrees in broadcast journalism and political science. He also minored in Spanish.

Prior to joining KESQ-TV, Daut worked at KCBS-TV in Los Angeles.

He is the recipient of three Emmy Awards.

References

External links
Official KESQ biography

1983 births
Living people
American male journalists
Journalists from California
Television anchors from Los Angeles
University of Southern California alumni
USC Annenberg School for Communication and Journalism alumni